Numan may refer to:

Places
 Ma`arat al-Numan, Syria
 Numan, Nigeria

People
 Ahmad Muhammad Numan (1909–1996), twice Prime Minister of the Yemen Arab Republic (1965, 1971)
 An-Numan ibn Muqarrin (died 641), a companion of the Islamic prophet Muhammad
 Arthur Numan (born 1969), Dutch former footballer
 Gary Numan (born 1958), English musician
 Henk Numan (born 1955), Dutch former judoka
 Köprülü Numan Pasha (died 1719), grand vizier of the Ottoman Empire (1710–11)
 Numan Gumaa (born 1937), Egyptian attorney and former chairman of the liberal New Wafd Party
 Yasin Said Numan (born 1948), Prime Minister of the People's Democratic Republic of Yemen (1986–90)

Media and fiction
 Numan (race), a fictional race of beings from the Phantasy Star series
 Numan Athletics, a 1993 arcade game by Namco

See also
 Nu'man, Arabic given name
 Naaman  (disambiguation)
 Newman, a surname
 Newman (disambiguation)
 Neuman